Edward Griffiths (7 March 1929 – 18 October 1995) was a British Labour politician and director of the British Steel Association.

Griffiths was elected Member of Parliament (MP) for Sheffield Brightside in a 1968 by-election.  In September 1974, he was deselected as a candidate by his local Constituency Labour Party in favour of Joan Maynard one month before a general election, and then decided to stand against Maynard as an Independent Labour candidate.  He lost by a margin of 7,926 votes (22%), although he polled 28% of the vote and finished in second place.  However, he was never elected an MP again.

In 1979 Griffiths switched sides and supported the Conservatives in the 1979 General Election held in May. His defection was announced at an election rally for trade unionists who supported the Conservatives held in London on 29 April 1979.

References 

Times Guide to the House of Commons October 1974

External links 
 

1929 births
1995 deaths
Independent politicians in England
Iron and Steel Trades Confederation-sponsored MPs
Labour Party (UK) MPs for English constituencies
UK MPs 1966–1970
UK MPs 1970–1974
UK MPs 1974
Conservative Party (UK) politicians